The 5th Asian Winter Games took place from February 1 to 8, 2003 in Aomori Prefecture, Japan.

Mascot
The 2003 Winter Asiad mascot is Winta, a black woodpecker.

Venues
The venues for the 2003 Winter Asiad were distributed all over Aomori Prefecture. 
Ajigasawa Town:
Ajigasawa Ski Area - Freestyle skiing, snowboarding
Aomori City:
Aomori City Sports Complex - Curling
Aomori Prefectural Skating Rink - Figure skating
Hachinohe City:
Nagane Park Speed Skating Rink - Speed skating
Niida Indoor Rink - Ice hockey (men's)
Iwaki Town:
Iwaki General Athletic Park - Biathlon
Misawa City:
Misawa Ice Arena - Ice hockey (women's), short-track speed skating

Owani Town:
Ajara Athletic Park - Cross-country skiing
Owani Onsen Ski Area - Alpine skiing
Takinosawa Ski Jumping Hill - Ski jumping

Sports
A total of 51 medal events in 11 medal sports were contested in the 5th Asian Winter Games. Freestyle skiing was reinstated, and ski jumping, a demonstration sport in past Winter Asiads, was included in the official roster of medal events. The numbers in parentheses indicate the number of events for the sport.

 
 
 
 
 
 
 
 
 
 
 

Demonstration sports
  (Women)

Participating nations
Names are arranged in alphabetical order. The number in parentheses indicates the number of participants (athletes and officials) that the NOC contributed.

Non-competing nations

Calendar

Medal table

References

External links
Official Website of the 5th Winter Asian Games

 
Asian Games
2003 in winter sports
Asian Winter Games
Asian Games
Asian Winter Games, 2003
Multi-sport events in Japan
February 2003 sports events in Asia
Sports competitions in Aomori Prefecture